Tbrb may refer to:

The Beatles: Rock Band, a video game
The Transnational Boxing Rankings Board, a boxing ranking organization